The varieties of Ecuadorian maize are the repository of a rich farming and cooking tradition.

Maize is cropped almost everywhere in Ecuador, with the exception of the Altiplano, the cold desert highlands 3000 meters above sea level. Maize production is concentrated in the provinces of Loja, Azuay, and Pichincha, and to a lesser extent Bolívar, Chimborazo, Tungurahua, and Imbabura, provinces located in the mountains. Maize is also found in the coastal provinces, Manabí, Esmeraldas, and Guayas, as well as Pastaza, part of the Ecuadorian Amazon.

Use as food
Most traditional foods are strictly linked to specific maize kernel types as well as grinding and cooking techniques. Cooked or toasted grains, and puddings of partially ripe grains, are prepared with mostly floury kernel varieties;
 Chicha - brewed drink of ground maize kernels,
 Chullpi - sweet maize,
 Maíz tierno - soft maize, at the milk ripeness stage,
 Maíz cao - waxy stage maize,
 Mote - boiled maize with beans,
 Canguil - popcorn,
 Pan - bread of maize flour, kneaded and baked,
 Tamal - maize and meat rolls,
 Tortillas - flatbread of maize flour, kneaded and cooked on a hot plate,
 Tostado - toasted maize with or without fat.

History
Maize is believed to have crossed the Isthmus of Panama around 5,000 years BCE reaching Colombia and later the Ecuadorian coast. Since then, domestication and evolution of native varieties followed this pattern;
 adaptation to the low and middle highlands of the Eastern Andes,
 creation of the primitive races and extension of the adaptation area,
 introgression by hybridization with Tripsacum,
 partial introduction of maize from other regions,
 inter-racial hybridization and creation of hybrid races in the highlands,
 selection of the endosperm composition, kernel size and shelling fitness, taste, and the suitability for chicha and chicha morada brewed drinks.

The first description of Ecuadorian maize varieties was written by the colonial chronicler Father Juan de Velasco (1727–1792);
 Amarillo (Yellow) - large and soft,
 Blanco (White) - large, long, very soft, used for bread flour,
 Canguil - small, hard, pointed, used for popcorn,
 Carapali - medium size, white with red apex,
 Chulpi or Chullpi - white, medium, very soft and sweet, sweet corn,
 Morocho - small, medium, yellow, hard, used to brew chicha,
 Negro grueso - black, large, and hard,
 Negro mediano - black and soft,
 Tumbaque - large, flat, dark green, and soft.

Contemporary classification

Kernels of maize varieties eaten in Ecuador are the outcome of the evolution of varieties of the following morphological groups described by Alfred Sturtevant;
 Zea mays everta - popcorn, known locally as canguiles,
 Zea mays amylosaccharata - sweet corn, known locally as chullpi,
 Zea mays indurada	- dark maize, known locally as maíz morocho,
 Zea mays amylacea	- soft maize, known locally as maíz suave.

During 1962 and 1963 Aureliano Brandolini collected 458 seed samples of the Ecuadorian varieties within the equatorial zone, between 2° North and -6° South. The comparative study of the behavior of these accessions resulted in the identification of racial complexes corresponding to those described earlier by D.H. Timothy and collaborators. A few races, morocho, harinoso dentado, montaña, and candela, were not included in the sampled varieties, while a few new races were described, such as colorado puntiagudo, harinoso cónico, and huaco sara, as well as tunicata, a variety cropped in Bolívar Province.

The classification of Ecuadorian maize was based on the following data; location and environment (altitude and photoperiodic response included), plant and ear characteristics, cytological analysis of the chromosomes, and historic and ethnographic information concerning the crop.

The tripsacoid races of everta, indentata, and indurata, sections were separated from the primitive ones of the amilacea, amylosaccharata,
indurata, and tunicata sections, and from maize imported or derived in historical times from the amylacea and indurata sections.

This study underlined that:
 The Canguiles group from the Andean highlands is not sensitive to photoperiod change, as well as the Lima varieties of possible recent introduction. These varieties apparently have gametophytic isolation characteristics.
 The varieties of lowland tropical origin are luxuriant, reaching over 5.5 meters of height, tassel excluded. By comparison, Canguiles and the flint kernel maize from the highlands sierra, Morocho, Patillo, Perlilla, and Tusilla, have a plant size lower than 2.0 meters.
 The tassel size varies greatly and is not linked to the environment; the shortest tassel is that of the tropical Dentado, the largest, 55 cm, is that of the sierra Uchima.

Studies enabled the identification of the following racial complexes and races:

 Zea mays everta
 a. formas primitivas (primitive forms)
Canguil
 b. formas derivadas (derived forms)
 Canguil grueso
 Zea mays indurata
 a. formas primitivas
 Clavito
 Enano gigante
 Morocho 8 hileras
 Pira
 b. formas derivadas
 Andanqui
 Morocho Colorado
 Uchima
 Yungueño
 c. formas de reciente introducción (recently introduced forms)
 Cubano
 Zea mays indentata
 Dentado
 Sintético
 Zea mays indurata
 a. grano blanco (white kernel)
 Morocho (Sabanero)
 Perlilla
 Tusilla
 b. Grano colorado y semivítreo (Reddish and semi-flint kernel)
 Kcello / Nal Tel
 Patillo
 Zea mays amylacea
 a. grano blanco
 Harinoso 8 hileras
 b. grano amarillo (yellow kernel)
 Mishca
 c. grano rojo (red kernel)
 Harinoso cónico
 Harinoso puntiagudo
 Racimo de uva
 Zea mays amylosaccharata
 Chullpi
 Zea mays tunicata
 Huaco

Important primitive, derived or imported traditional varieties still cropped are:
 Highlands sierra
 Maíz suave (soft maize)
 Huandango
 Maíz cónico dentado
 Maíz de los Chillos
 Maíz harinoso dentado
 Morocho (dark maize)
 Montaña
 Morochón
 Sabanero ecuadoriano
 Tusilla
 Uchima
 Maíz precoz (early maize)
 Kcello
 La Costa (The Coast) & El Oriente (The East)
 Maíz duro (hard maize)
 Chococeño
 Cubano
 Maíz blando (soft maize)
 Candela
 Gallina
 Tuxpeño

See also 

 Binomial nomenclature
 Bolivia maize varieties
 International Maize and Wheat Improvement Center
 List of Ecuadorian dishes and foods
 Subspecies
 Ternary name

References

External links 
 International Maize and Wheat Improvement Center official site

Maize varieties
Ecuadorian cuisine